Justin Chenette (born April 23, 1991) is an American politician from Maine. Chenette, a Democrat, formerly represented District 31 in the Maine Senate. Chenette made history at age 21 becoming the youngest legislator in Maine, and was one of five openly gay members of the Maine Legislature.

Chenette was also youngest openly gay legislator in the United States. Owing to this, The Advocate magazine named Chenette "an architect of the next decade" and listed him among the 40 Under 40 most accomplished leaders throughout the country in 2013.

Early life and education
Chenette was born in St. Albans, Vermont. He is the son of Jennifer Minthorn (née McIsaac) and Dr. Steven Mark Chenette. His father died in 2000 when Chenette was nine years old from complications of diabetes.  Chenette's stepfather was a Saco City Councilor, Alan Minthorn.

Chenette graduated high school from Thornton Academy in Saco, Maine. While in high school, Chenette was the station manager, executive producer, anchor, reporter, and host of Thornton Academy's TATV Channel 3, Saco's educational television station. TATV is one of the only student-run educational TV stations in the country. At the station, Chenette hosted a public affairs show he created, The Issue and produced three live election results shows. His work was recognized by the Student Television Network by honoring Chenette as the 2009 Student Broadcast Journalist of the Year.

Based on his media efforts in high school, Chenette was selected as a Gannett Journalism Scholar for two consecutive years in 2009 and 2010. After interning at WPFO FOX 23 in Portland, Maine in 2011, Chenette was offered a job created as the assistant morning producer of their news program, Good Day Maine. Chenette worked on developing new segments and booked various entertainment and informative guests for the show. He also updated FOX's website on the weekends as web producer.

Chenette took courses through the early studies program at the University College at Saco and at the University of Southern Maine. He went to graduate a semester early from Lyndon State College with a bachelor's degree in broadcasting, Associate degree in TV news, and minors in political science and multimedia communications.

In 2019, Chenette completed Harvard University's John F. Kennedy School of Government program for Senior Executives in State and Local Government as a David Bohnett LGBTQ Victory Institute Leadership Fellow.

Early career 
In 2008, Governor John Baldacci appointed Chenette to the Maine State Board of Education making him the first student member in the history of the board at age 17. In his 16-month term, Chenette pushed for civic engagement curriculum, a universal grading system, increased drug prevention, and to shore up the educational disparity between northern and southern Maine. Chenette served on the Student Voices Committee.

In May 2012, Chenette was elected at the Maine State Democratic Convention as an at-large delegate to the 2012 Democratic National Convention down in Charlotte, North Carolina. Chenette was one of the youngest members of Maine's delegation to the DNC.

Chenette served as an intern for Republican U.S. Senator Olympia Snowe prior to her retirement in 2012.

Maine House of Representatives

2012 election

Chenette announced his first run for public office at the age 20, while he was still attending college, when the sitting State Representative Linda Valentino was termed out and seeking the State Senate seat. He faced a Democratic challenger in the June Primary.

Chenette was elected in 2012 to the Maine House of Representatives after winning the Democratic primary for the seat against challenger Sonya Lundh-Gay with 78% of the vote, and going on to win the general election over Republican challenger Roland Wyman with 60% of the vote.

2014 election

Chenette was unopposed in his re-election to the newly redrawn district 15 in the June Primary. He went on to face Saco Republican Chairwoman Carol Patterson in the General Election replacing Republican candidate Frederick Fortier who dropped out of the race. There was controversy surrounding the transparency of his replacement in selecting Patterson. In what many considered to be a wave election for Republicans, Chenette won re-election two percentage points higher than his previous election with 62% of the vote.

Committee assignments and caucuses
Criminal Justice & Public Safety Committee (2014–Present) 
 State & Local Government Committee (2012-2014) 
 Legislative Youth Caucus, Co-Chair (2012–Present)

2020

On August 11, 2020, Chenette announced that he was withdrawing from the Senate District 31 race.  Instead of running for re-election, Chenette in a release said he planned to empower the next generation of voters through the launch of a civics education organization called the Maine Democracy Project, would publish a full-length children’s book version of his state government coloring book The Great Whoopie Pie Debate, and would be working to help retain Democratic majorities in the Legislature. However, in 2022, Chenette sought and won York County (ME) District 3 Commissioner seat.

Electoral history

Personal life
Chenette is married to Eduard Chenette, an environmental engineer.

Chenette works at the Journal Tribune, a newspaper located in Biddeford, as their digital advertising executive. There he started two new initiatives, JT CARES, a nonprofit charitable arm of the paper, and JT MEDIA, a full-service marketing arm that provides a range of new media services to businesses. In 2013, Chenette started his first small business, Chenette Media LLC, a multimedia public relations company based in Saco. He previously worked at Rocky Coast Marketing, a full-service advertising and marketing firm, as vice-president of social media, specializing in web creation/management, media relations, and social media outreach.

References

1991 births
Gay politicians
LGBT people from Vermont
LGBT state legislators in Maine
People from Saco, Maine
Democratic Party members of the Maine House of Representatives
Living people
Lyndon State College alumni
21st-century American politicians
Democratic Party Maine state senators
Thornton Academy alumni